Godfrey  Clarke (born c. 1684 – 1734), was an English landowner and politician who sat in the House of Commons from 1710 to 1734.

Clarke was the son of Sir Gilbert Clarke of Chilcote and his second wife Barbara Clerke daughter of George Clerke of Northamptonshire. The family was long associated with Somersall Hall and  had acquired Chilcote Hall (now demolished) in the 17th century.  He was educated at Rugby School in 1690 and matriculated at Magdalen College, Oxford on 25 June 1695, aged 16. He succeeded his father on 30 May 1701.  He was appointed deputy-lieutenant in 1702, and was High Sheriff of Derbyshire for the year 1705 to 1706. He contracted  a favourable marriage with Catherine Stanhope daughter of Philip Stanhope, 2nd Earl of Chesterfield in 1706 and this connected him with the peerage.  
 
Clarke was returned unopposed as Member of Parliament for Derbyshire at the 1710 general election. He was returned unopposed with Curzon again in 1713], and was classed as a Tory. Clarke was returned unopposed  at the [British general election, 1715|1715 general election and voted against the Government in 1719 on the repeal of the Occasional Conformity and Schism Acts and the Peerage Bill. He was returned again in  1722 and 1727. He died just before the 1734 general election.

Clarke died unmarried on 14 March 1734. His estates went to his nephew Godfrey Clarke, son of his deceased brother, Gilbert Clarke, of Ulcombe, Kent. The son of this Godfrey Clarke was Godfrey Bagnall Clarke (born about 1742)  the last member of the family of Chilcote.

References

1680s births
1740s deaths
Members of the Parliament of Great Britain for Derbyshire
British MPs 1710–1713
British MPs 1715–1722
British MPs 1722–1727
British MPs 1727–1734